The 2033 Rugby World Cup is scheduled to be the twelfth edition of the women's Rugby World Cup, to be held in the United States in 2033. This will be the second Women’s Rugby World Cup to be held in the Americas. The previous one was held in Canada in 2006 with New Zealand emerging as the champions.

Host nation selection
The United States was the only bidder for the tournament. The US was selected as the host nation on May 12, 2022.

Development & preparations

Candidate host cities

A total of 24 cities throughout the United States have expressed interest in hosting matches. Atlanta, Austin, Baltimore, Birmingham, Boston, Charlotte, Chicago, Dallas, Denver, Houston, Kansas City, Los Angeles, Miami, Minneapolis, Nashville, New York City, Orlando, Philadelphia, Pittsburgh, Phoenix, San Diego, San Francisco, Seattle and Washington D.C. have all expressed interest.

See also

2031 Rugby World Cup

References

 
2033
2033 rugby union tournaments for national teams
2033 in women's rugby union
International women's rugby union competitions hosted by the United States
World Cup 2033
Rugby World Cup
2033 in American rugby union